Tombi Golgir (also Romanized as Tombī Golgīr and Tembī Gelgīr; also known as Tambīān, Tembī, Tembiūn, Temblun, and Tombī) is a village in Tombi Golgir Rural District, Golgir District, Masjed Soleyman County, Khuzestan Province, Iran. At the 2006 census, its population was 241, in 38 families.

References 

Populated places in Masjed Soleyman County